August Ferdinand Hermann Kretzschmar (19 January 1848 – 10 May 1924) was a German musicologist and writer, and is considered a founder of hermeneutics in musical interpretation and study.

Life and career 
Born in Olbernhau, Saxony, Kretzschmar was son of the organist and cantor Karl Dankegott Kretzschmar and Karoline Wilhelmine, née Leupold. He was from 1862 a student in the Kreuzschule in Dresden, where from 1867–1868 he was twice Prefect of the Dresdner Kreuzchor. In addition, from 1870 he studied Philology at Leipzig University as well as Music at the Leipzig Conservatory and was awarded his doctorate there. From 1871 he was actively teaching in Theory, Composition, Piano and Organ at the Leipzig Conservatory, and acted as director/conductor for various musical societies. In 1876 he spent a year as theatre orchestra conductor in Metz (described as an "adventurous episode"), and undertook research expeditions in England and Italy for the study of musical history; from 1877 to 1887 he was Director of Music at the University of Rostock, and city music director there from 1880.

 
From 1887 to 1904 he renewed his position in Leipzig as active University Music Director. From 1888-1898 he was Director of the Riedel Choral Society. In the year 1890 he was awarded an honorary professorship, and in 1890 he founded the Leipzig Academic Concerts which he conducted until 1895. In 1904 he was appointed as regular Professor of Music at the University of Berlin, and from 1907–1922 he was Director of the Royal Institute for Church Music.

From 1909 to 1920 (as successor to Joseph Joachim) he was Director of the Königlich Akademischen Hochschule für ausübende Tonkunst founded in 1869, later the Musikhochschule Berlin (the Berlin High School for Music). In 1912 he was elected Chairman of the de:Preußische Musikgeschichtlichen Kommission (Prussian Music History Commission) and thus the editor of the Denkmäler deutscher Tonkunst. This historical music edition was begun in 1892 by Brahms, Joachim and Philipp Spitta.

He was a government privy counsellor. One of his students was composer and musicologist Walter Niemann.

Hermeneutics
Kretschmar founded the discipline of musical hermeneutics in around 1900.

According to the musicologist Maria Fuchs, 
"The discipline of musical hermeneutics explores the discursive meanings of musical works...[It] concentrates on the "interpretation and paraphrasing of the affects, feelings, expressive characters, and moods" of a piece of music. In contrast to the formal-aesthetic approach to concert music analysis—closely connected to German music critic Eduard Hanslick (1825–1904) and his idea of 'absolute music'—musical hermeneutics was based on an aesthetics of content and affects."

Death
He died in Berlin-Schlachtensee in 1924, after which he was buried in a grave of honour in the de:Protestant Nicholassee churchyard of the  :de:Kirche Nikolassee in Berlin.

Personal life
Kretzschmar was married in 1880 to the British pianist Clara Meller (Bristol, 3 February 1855 -    6 May 1903, Leipzig). She gave her début concert at the Leipzig Gewandhaus in 1877, and accompanied the Austrian soprano Minna Peschka-Leutner in a number of concerts that year. In Göttingen in March she played Beethoven's Kreutzer sonata, pieces by Schumann, Liszt and Wagner arr. Tausig, and one or other of Chopin's A-flat major waltzes.

In October 1878 she played Schumann's Piano Concerto in a concert at the Rostock Konzertverein, conducted by Kretschmar, who was the music director at Rostock University She continued to give concerts after their marriage; her repertoire included Brahms' 2nd piano concerto, Saint-Saëns' second, the concerto for three keyboards, BWV 1064 by J. S. Bach, and the F-sharp minor concerto by Hans von Bronsart. She died aged 48 in Leipzig. They had no children.

Literary allusion 
In his novel Doktor Faustus, Thomas Mann creates the character of Dr Wendell Kretschmar, the inspirational and eccentric musicologist, lecturer and teacher of the composer Adrian Leverkühn. The name is probably given in homage to his real-life contemporary Hermann Kretzschmar, whose essays in musical interpretation were widely read and appreciated around the turn of the twentieth century.

Works 
  (Guide through the Concert Hall). Leipzig (1887–90).
 [https://archive.org/details/fhrerdurchdenko02kretgoog/page/n4/mode/2up Vol. I, Parts 1 & 2: ] (Symphonies and Suites). Leipzig: Breitkopf & Härtel (6th edition 1921) 
 Vol. II, Part 1:  (Sacred works). Leipzig: Breitkopf & Härtel (5th edition 1921)
 Vol II, Part 2:  (Oratorios and secular choral works) Leipzig: Breitkopf & Härtel (4th edition 1920) 
  (History of new German song). (Part I, from Albert to Zelter only completed - mainly 17th and 18th centuries). Leipzig: Breitkopf & Härtel (1911).
  (Collected Essays on music and other subjects) - Leipzig: Breitkopf & Härtel, and C. F. Peters 
 Volume I:  (Collected Essays on Music from the journal Die Grenzboten). Leipzig: Breitkopf & Härtel (1910, 2nd ed. 1911) 
 Volume II:  (Collected Essays from the Peters Music Library Yearbook). Leipzig, C. F. Peters (1911)
 A projected Volume III:  seems not to have appeared in print. 
  (History of Opera). Leipzig: Breitkopf & Härtel (1919)
  (Introduction to the History of Music), 1920

References

Notes

Citations

Bibliography

External links 

 Literature of and about Hermann Kretzschmar in the Catalogue of the German National Library. 
 Symposium: Hermann Kretzschmar - Teacher and Performer in one person.
 

1848 births
1924 deaths
Opera scholarship
People from the Kingdom of Saxony
Leipzig University alumni
Academic staff of Leipzig University
Academic staff of the Humboldt University of Berlin
People educated at the Kreuzschule
19th-century German musicians
19th-century German male musicians
19th-century German musicologists